Gudžiūnai is a village in Kėdainiai district municipality, in Kaunas County, in central Lithuania. According to the 2011 census, the village has a population of 61 people. It is located around Gudžiūnai town, between the Dotnuvėlė river and its tributaries Srautas and Krevė.

Demography

References

Villages in Kaunas County
Kėdainiai District Municipality